WRBX is a 4900 watt station covering parts of south Georgia. The format is Southern Gospel with a mix of blueglass gospel, classic songs and current top 80 hits.

WRBX is also the voice of Tattnall County High School Warrior Sports.

External links
 

Moody Radio affiliate stations
Southern Gospel radio stations in the United States
RBX